Mark Wool (born 10 February 1990), also known by the nickname of "Woolly"', is a Welsh former rugby union and professional rugby league footballer.

International honours
Mark Wool won a cap for Wales while at Leeds Rhinos in 2010, and also played for the Great Britain Community Lions with a tour to Australia, and a second tourin 2011. Mark then played for Huddersfield Giants RFL. He started his rugby league career at Valley Cougars at the age of 17; previously to this he played rugby union from the age of seven, playing for Pontyclun RFU minis and juniors and then for youth and played a few games for the first team.

Personal life
Mark is the son of Caroline and Andrew Wool. He grew up in Pontyclun, where his family still live, and attended Pontyclun Primary school and Y Pant School. He is the eldest of three siblings, Chris and Carrie. When he was 19 he moved to Leeds to attend Leeds Metropolitan University. He left after deferring his second year. Mark currently lives in Leeds with his Wife (Fran) and their son and daughter. He currently works as regional manager for Arc inspiration.

References

1990 births
Living people
Leeds Rhinos players
Rugby league locks
Rugby league players from Pontypridd
Rugby union players from Pontypridd
Wales national rugby league team players
Welsh rugby league players